Goce Nikolovski (Macedonian: Гоце Николовски; 1947 – 16 December 2006) was a famous Macedonian singer, known for his hit "Biser Balkanski" ("Pearl of the Balkans").

Nikolovski was born in Skopje, Yugoslavia (present-day North Macedonia) in 1947. His popularity peaked in 1990, when his song "Biser Balkanski" won 1st prize at the Folk Fest Valandovo 1990 Song Festival, an annual competition in which singers from the former Yugoslavia competed to find the best song.

The song became an instant classic in Macedonia, even becoming somewhat of an anthem to a nation just starting off after its breakup from Yugoslavia. Nikolovski was also given the nickname "Biser Balkanski" following the song.

Throughout the 1990s, Nikolovski went on to release several other hits, but none would measure up to the success that he found with "Biser Balkanski". In 1992, Nikolovski took part in the Canberra '92 Festival, a concert similar to the annual Valandovo song festival, with the song "Od Majka Nema Pomila".

Nikolovski's popularity declined as time progressed, and by the start of the 21st century, he had virtually disappeared from the public eye.

Death 
On 16 December 2006, Nikolovski's neighbours heard a gunshot coming from the home of the singer at around 10:00 pm local time. At around 3:00 am the following morning, Police arrived at Nikolovski's house which was locked from the inside and found the 59-year-old singer dead in his home, he had committed suicide with a gunshot to the head. It has since been confirmed that Nikolovski was alone at the time.

Nikolovski was found with a wound to the head. His gun was found nearby, as well as a suicide note that was written to his family. Police ruled out any suspicious activity.

References

1947 births
2006 suicides
20th-century Macedonian male singers
Musicians from Skopje
Suicides by firearm in North Macedonia
Macedonian folk-pop singers
Yugoslav male singers